Sir James Henry Peter McNeish  (23 October 1931 – 11 November 2016) was a New Zealand novelist, playwright and biographer.

Biography
McNeish attended Auckland Grammar School and graduated from Auckland University College with a degree in languages. He travelled the world as a young man, working as a deckhand on a Norwegian freighter in 1958, and recording folk music in 21 countries. He worked in the Theatre Workshop in London with Joan Littlewood, and was influenced by her spirit of socially-committed drama. He worked as a freelance programme and documentary maker for the BBC Radio's Features Department in the 1960s. He also wrote for The Guardian and The Observer. He spent three years in Sicily with Danilo Dolci, the non-violent anti-Mafia reformer, and wrote Fire under the Ashes (1965, London: Hodder and Stoughton) a biographical account of Dolci's life which is remarkable for its objectivity and clarity. He wrote some 25 books.

McNeish's writing has been the subject of critical acclaim both at home and abroad. Besides New Zealand, his books are set in Sicily, London, Israel and New Caledonia. He was described as "prolific" by the Oxford Companion to New Zealand Literature. His book Lovelock was nominated for the 1986 Booker Prize.

In 1999, McNeish was awarded the prestigious National Library of New Zealand Research Fellowship, allowing him to research the lives and friendships of five prominent New Zealanders who attended Oxford University in the 1930s—four of them Rhodes Scholars: James Bertram, Geoffrey Cox, Dan Davin, Ian Milner and John Mulgan. This multi-biography was published under the title The Dance of the Peacocks: New Zealanders in exile in the time of Hitler and Mao Tse Tung (2003). In the same vein, The Sixth Man (2007) is a biography of another gifted New Zealander, Paddy Costello, who studied at Cambridge University during the same period and whose subsequent career in the Foreign Office was marred by controversy.

In 2010, McNeish was honoured with the Prime Minister's Award for Literary Achievement in Non-Fiction. His intention was to donate part of his prize towards a travel scholarship—'a hardship scheme'—for young writers.

It was said about McNeish that among New Zealand novelists, he was the 'wild card'. In an interview with Philip Matthews in 2010 (Weekend, 26 June 2010), he said: "I've always been an outsider, and I'm quite comfortable with that. To retain your critical sense in a small society like New Zealand, you have to stand apart".

In the 2011 New Year Honours, McNeish was appointed as Knight Companion of the New Zealand Order of Merit for services to literature.

McNeish lived in Wellington, New Zealand, with his wife Helen, Lady McNeish. He has one son Mark and one daughter, Kathryn. He died on 11 November 2016, aged 85, several days after submitting his final manuscript, Breaking Ranks, to HarperCollins for publication in April 2017.

Awards
Recipient of the Katherine Mansfield Menton Fellowship, France, 1973
Writer in Residence, Berlin Kuenstler Program, 1983
National Library of New Zealand Research Fellow, 1999
Berlin Writers' Residency 2009 funded by Creative New Zealand, the national agency for the development of the arts in New Zealand.
Recipient of the 2010 Prime Minister's Award for Literary Achievement in non-fiction.
Knight Companion of the New Zealand Order of Merit, 31 December 2010 New Year Honours.
President of Honour of the New Zealand Society of Authors, 2012–2013

Major works
Novels
Mackenzie (1970)
The Mackenzie Affair (1972)
The Glass Zoo (1976)
Joy (1982)
Lovelock (1986; enlarged edition, 2009)
Penelope's Island (1990)
My Name Is Paradiso (1995)
Mr Halliday & the Circus Master (1996)
The Crime of Huey Dunstan (2010)

Non-Fiction
Tavern in the Town (1957; revised and enlarged, 1984)
Fire Under the Ashes: A Life of Danilo Dolci (1965)
Larks in a Paradise (with Marti Friedlander) (1974)
As for the Godwits (1977)
Art of the Pacific (with Brian Brake) (1980)
Belonging: Conversations in Israel (1980)
Walking on my Feet: A Life of A.R.D. Fairburn (with Helen McNeish) (1983)
Ahnungslos in Berlin: A Berlin Diary (1985)
The Man from Nowhere & Other Prose (1991)
The Mask of Sanity: The Bain Murders (1997)
An Albatross Too Many (1998)
Dance of the Peacocks: New Zealanders in exile in the time of Hitler and Mao Tse-tung (Vintage Books, 2003), 
The Sixth Man: the extraordinary life of Paddy Costello (2007)
Touchstones – Memories of people and place (2012)
Seelenbinder: the Olympian who defied Hitler (2016)

Plays
The Mouse Man (1975)
Eighteen Ninety-Five (1975)
The Rocking Cave (1973)
Thursday Bloody Thursday (1998)

Articles, reviews and essays

Anthology

 Not so far from Godwit Bay, In From a Room of their Own, A Celebration of the Katherine Mansfield Fellowship, Auckland, Whitcoulls, (1993)

Articles

 A visit to Denis Glover, Quote Unquote (30 Dec 1995) 17–19
 Ambush aftermath in New Caledonia, The Press (1991) 18
 Did Ulysses just sail round Sicily? The Dominion (1991) 8
 Mulgan's War, The Listener (April 1994) 38
 Paper exodus sends our literary heritage abroad, The Dominion Sunday Times (1990) 9–20
 Paper exodus sends our literary heritage abroad, Archifacts (April 1991) 77–91
 Patric's Day (Obit of Patric Carey) The Listener (September 2006)
 
Biography

 Walking on my feet: A. R. D. Fairburn : a kind of biography. Auckland, Collins 1983, New Outlook Dec 1983/Jan 1984 Dec/Jan (1983) 37

Interview
 The Greek Experience: a conversation with David Kennedy, Art New Zealand 36 (1985) 50–53

Letter
 Murder in Bainville: an open letter to Graeme Lay, Quote Unquote 25 July (1995) 16–17

Non-Fiction

 A war of nerves, The Listener 118.2486 (1987) 16–19
 Breaking the silence, The Listener 146.2850 (1994) 20–25
 Case closed : how and why David Bain killed his family, The Listener (1997) 18
 Lovelock's dream mile, The Listener 145.2839 (1994) 24–25

Tavern in the Town. Wellington: Reed, 1957

 The Ends of Empire : Part 1, The Listener 115.2448 (1987) 11–15
 The Ends of Empire : Part 2, The Listener 115.2449 (1987) 10–13
 The Grand Old Hotels of Thermal-land, Meanjin Quarterly 47 May (1985) 144–148

The Man From Nowhere & Other Prose. Auckland: Godwit, 1991

North and South Dec (1991) 119–123 
Walking on My Feet : A. R. D. Fairburn, 1904–1957 : a Kind of Biography. Auckland: Collins, 1983

 Who will guard the peace? The Listener ang2057  124.2571 (1989) 12–15
          Landfall 37 June (1983) 218–220
          New Outlook Autumn (1983) 35
 
Lovelock' Auckland, Godwit, 1994

          New Zealand Runner 49 April (1987) 16

Mackenzie: a Novel Auckland: Godwit, 1995

          Affairs 91 Mar (1971). Quote Unquote 22 April (1995) 30–31

Mr Halliday and the Circus Master. Auckland: David Ling Publishing, 1996

          Quote Unquote 41 Nov (1996) 30
          North and South 128 Nov (1996) 140–142
          New Zealand Books 7.1 Mar (1997) 10–11

My Name is Paradiso, Auckland: David Ling Publishing, 1995.

          Quote Unquote 24 June (1995) 26
          Metro 169 July (1995) 117–119
          Landfall 190 Spring (1995) 360–362
          New Zealand Books 5.5 Dec (1995) 9-11

Penelope's Island, Auckland: Hodder and Stoughton, 1990

          Metro 113 Nov (1990) 180–182
          New & Notable 7.5 Nov (1990) 5

The Glass Zoo, London, Hodder and Stoughton, 1976

          Best Sellers 36 Sept (1976) 184-184
          Landfall 30 Sept (1976) 208–211
          Islands 5.1 Sept (1976) 100–102

The Mackenzie Affair, Auckland: Hodder and Stoughton, 1972

Profile
 Last of the fighting brigadiers, New Zealand Herald (1993) 2-2
 Last of the fighting brigadiers, The Press(1993) 12
 Last of the fighting brigadiers, The Dominion (1993) 11
 The man between the rivers, Otago Daily Times (1993) 21
           New Zealand Geographic 8 Oct/Dec (1990) 18–41
 The man who made social medicine work (George McCall Smith, 1883–1958) The Listener April (1976) 20–21
 Review        The Listener 1565 Oct (1969) 20
          The Dominion Oct (1993) 16
          Quote Unquote 38 Aug (1996) 30

Sources

Articles

 Leek, Robert H., Home-grown vintage 73, Islands 2 Spring (1973) 315–318
 Four writers awarded scholarships, The Dominion (1989) 13
 Leigh, Jack, Circular journeys, The New Zealand Herald (1995) 6
 Mannion, Robert, A view to a killing, The Dominion (1997) 7
 Pennell, Graeme, Two faces of the same tragedy, Otago Daily Times (1997) 23
 Pennell, Graeme, Who pulled the trigger? David or Robin Bain? The New Zealand Herald (1997) 19
 Pennell, Graeme, Writers put Bain cases: murderer or victim? s18 The New Zealand Herald (1997) 17

Interviews

 Haley, Russell, Underdogs and overdogs, New Outlook Autumn (1983) 18–20
 King, John, A Sicilian adventure, The Evening Post(1995) 9–10
 Samson, Alan, Cold, Mafia inspire new book, (1995) 9
 Nichol, Ruth, Skinning a pumpkin, Quote Unquote 24 June (1995) 27
 Kitchin, Peter, Madness, murder in family of misfits, The Evening Post (1997) 5
 Van Beynen, Martin, The Bain murders : a psychological mystery? (1997) 3
 Saker, Nicola, At the writers desk: James McNeish, Wellington City Magazine Summer (1986) 56
                McNeish – just a man who writes books, The Dominion (1989) 13
 Sharp, Iain, Ironies with wry detachment, New Zealand Books 5.5 Dec (1995) 9-11
 Bartel, Susan, National Library Fellow 1999: James McNeish, Off the Record 6 (1999) 4

Reviews

 Penguin, NZ Weekly News 5311 (1965) 41
 McEldowney, Dennis, The Listener 65.1626 (1970) 16
 Jones, Lloyd, Landfall 25 March (1971) 93–103
 Simpson, Tony, Affairs 91 March (1971)
 Cleveland, L., The Listener 71.1726 (1972) 56
 McEldowney, Dennis, Islands 2 Autumn (1973) 106–108
 Rea, Ken, Act 20 Aug (1973) 56–58
 King, Michael, NZ Bookworld 14 Feb/Mar (1975) 27
 Oppenheim, R., New Argot 3.1 Mar (1975) 4
 Fry, A., The Listener 79.1860 (1975) 50–51
 Bertram, James, The Listener 81.1898 (1976) 36–37
 Rhodes, H. Winston, Landfall 30 Sept (1976) 208–211
 Cunningham, Kevin, NZ Bookworld 25 June (1976) 19
             Observer (1976) 30
             New Statesman 91 (1976) 108
             TLS (The Times Literary Supplement) (1976) 76
             Kirkus Reviews 44 (1976) 343
             The Listener London 95 (1976) 108
             Christian Science Monitor 68 (1976) 27
             Best Sellers 36 Sept (1976) 184
             Library Journal 101 (1976)1798
 McEldowney, Dennis, Islands 5.1 Sept (1976) 100–102
 Sanderson, M., The Listener 87.1974 (1977) 76–77
 Owen, A., NZ Bookworld 45 Feb (1978) 21–22
 Lambrecht, Winifred, Library Journal 105 (1980) 1072
 Glatt, Carol R., Library Journal 105 (1980) 871
             Publishers Weekly 217 (1980) 101
             Kirkus Reviews 48 (1980) 192
             Publishers Weekly 217 (1980) 74
             Booklist 76 (1980) 1251
             Guardian Weekly 123 (1980) 21
 Stringer, Terry, Art New Auckland 15 (1980) 57
 Edmond, Lauris, New Outlook Dec (1983) 37
 Edmond, Lauris, New Outlook Dec 1983/Jan 1984 Dec/Jan (1983) 37
 Evans, P. Lipsync 103.2256 (1983) 98
 Gifkins, Michael, New Outlook Autumn (1983) 35
 Alpers, Antony, The Listener 2289.105 Dec (1983) 86
 Alpers, Antony, The Listener 105.2289 (1983) 86
 Theobald, G., PSA Journal 70.2 Mar (1983) 14
 Owens, J., Landfall 37 June (1983) 218–220
            NZ Wineglass 44 Dec (1984) 9
 Butterworth, S., The Listener 109.2343 (1985) 26
 King, Michael, Metro 6.66 Dec (1986) 269–273
 Robinson, Roger, The Listener 116.2465 (1987) 56
 Mowbray, Trevor, School Library Review 7.3 (1987) 16–26
 Fordyce, Stephen, New Zealand Runner 49 April (1987) 16
 Steinberg, Sybil, Publishers Weekly 233.20 (1988) 67
 Moffitt, D. New & Notable 7.5 Nov (1990) 5
 Crosbie, Sharon, The Dominion Sunday Times (1990) 13
 Brooke, Agnes Mary, The Press (1990) 27
 King, Michael, Metro 113 Nov (1990) 180–182
 Eggleton, David, The Evening Post (1990) 5
 Eggleton, David, Otago Daily Times (1990) 21
 Ireland, Kevin, The Dominion (1990) 7
 Lay, Graeme, The Listener 128.2641 (1990) 110–111
 Lay, Graeme, North and South Dec (1991) 119–123
 Burton, David, The Evening Post (1991) 5
 Palenski, Ron, The Dominion (1991) 9
 Swain, Pauline, The Dominion Sunday Times (1991) 22
 Wattie, Nelson, Landfall 45.3 Sept (1991) 368–370
 Griffiths, George, The Otago Daily Times (1992) 26
 Hill, David, The Listener (1995) 50
 Cooper, Ronda, Metro 169 July (1995) 117–119
 Lay, Graeme, North and South 110 May (1995) 128–132
 Smither, Elizabeth Quote Unquote 24 June (1995) 26
 Kroetsch, Laura. The Dominion (1995) 20
 King, John, The Evening Post (1995) 7
 Savage, Paul, The Press (1995) 11
 Broatch, Mark, Quote Unquote 22 April (1995) 30–31
 Jensen, Kai, Landfall 190 Spring (1995) 360–362
 James, Bryan, The Otago Daily Times (1995) 28
 Sharp, Iain, New Zealand Books 5.5 Dec (1995) 9-11
              The New Zealand Herald (1995) 6
 Cross, Ian, The Listener (1996) 47
 Simpson, Tony, The Dominion (1996) 20
 Scott, Bede, The Sunday Star Times (1996) 4
 McLauchlan, Gordon, The New Zealand Herald (1996) 8
 McLean, Gavin, The Otago Daily Times (1996) 22
 Stratford, Stephen, Quote Unquote 41 Nov (1996) 30
 Burnard, Trevor. The Press (1996) 16
 Eggleton, David, The Evening Post (1996) 7
 Lay, Graeme, North and South 128 Nov (1996) 140–142
 Cooper, Ronda, Metro 184 Oct (1996) 117–120
 Lay, Graeme, North and South 137 Aug (1997) 132–134
 Warner, Howard, New Zealand Books 7.1 Mar (1997) 10–11
 Van Beynen, Martin, The Press (1997) 16
 Kitchin, Peter, The Evening Post (1997) 7
 Richards, Ian, The Listener (1998) 45
 Prebble, Ray, The Evening Post (1998) 5
 Hill, David, The Dominion (1998) 20
 Ireland, Kevin, The New Zealand Herald (1998) 6
 Sandra K. Bogart NZHerald.co.nz (2007) 16 July
 Eugene Bingham NZHerald.co.nz (2007) 8 September
 Hill, David, NZHerald.co.nz'' (2010) 20 July

References

External links
Berlin Residency awarded by Creative New Zealand
New Zealand Literature File (Auckland University): James McNeish
James McNeish at New Zealand Book Council
Playmarket Biography
Beattiesbookblog.blogspot.com
 Beattiesbookblog.blogspot.co.nz

1931 births
2016 deaths
New Zealand male novelists
New Zealand crime fiction writers
University of Auckland alumni
New Zealand non-fiction writers
20th-century New Zealand dramatists and playwrights
New Zealand biographers
Male biographers
20th-century New Zealand novelists
20th-century biographers
New Zealand male dramatists and playwrights
Knights Companion of the New Zealand Order of Merit
People educated at Auckland Grammar School
20th-century New Zealand male writers
Male non-fiction writers